Gordon Cathcart Campbell  (4 June 1885 – 13 August 1961) was an Australian cricketer active from 1909 to 1915 who played for South Australia. 
 
Campbell was born in Myrtle Bank, South Australia and died in Woodville South, South Australia. He appeared in 23 first-class matches as a right-handed batsman who kept wicket. He scored 497 runs with a highest score of 43 and held 28 catches with 20 stumpings.

He toured North America with an Australian team from May to September 1913, a tour of 54 matches including five first-class matches. He was selected in the Australian team which was to tour South Africa in 1914-15 as one of the two wicket-keepers, as well as the manager and third selector; but war prevented the tour.

During the First World War, he served in the First Australian Imperial Force (1st AIF) with the rank of major and was awarded an MC in the 1917 New Year Honours. After the war ended, Campbell was appointed by the Australian Board of (Cricket) Control as its representative in dealings with the AIF Sports Control Board about the proposed AIF team which was formed out of military personnel as the Australian Imperial Force Touring XI.

See also
 List of South Australian representative cricketers

References

External links
 Gordon Campbell at CricketArchive

1885 births
1961 deaths
Australian cricketers
South Australia cricketers
Australian recipients of the Military Cross
People educated at St Peter's College, Adelaide
Australian military personnel of World War I